Hatim is an Indian television series that aired on Star Plus from 26 December 2003 until 12 November 2004. It has elements of fantasy, drama, and many other genres. It was directed by Amrit Sagar and is based on the work by Hatim al-Tai.

Plot 

In the Middle Ages, Hatim, the newborn son of the Emperor of Yemen, is proclaimed to spread the messages of peace and goodness. The son of the Emperor of Jaffar is born at the same time, and a palace resident named Najumi performs black magic to make the baby a servant of evil spirits. 

The Emperor of Jaffar decides that it would be better for the world if his newborn son is killed, and orders the baby's heart to be burned. Najumi burns a rabbit's heart instead and shows it to the Emperor, leading the Emperor to believe that his orders have been carried out. Najumi takes the child, names him Dajjal, and teaches him the dark arts. 

Twenty years pass. In Yemen, Hatim grows into a kind-hearted and beloved prince. In Jaffar, Dajjal kills his parents and becomes the Emperor. Dajjal creates an eternal fire at the top of the palace's tower that grants him dark powers. Najumi explains to Dajjal that Dajjal can become the supreme lord of the world if he is able to capture the forces of goodness. Dajjal can achieve this by marrying Sunena, the princess of Durgapur, who is goodness personified.

Dajjal arrives in Durgapur to ask Sunena for her hand in marriage, but she declines. When Dajjal threatens Sunena's teenage brother Suraj, Suraj slices Dajjal's hand with his sword. Dajjal's hand heals and Dajjal turns Suraj into a stone statue. Dajjal tells Sunena that he will only turn Suraj human again if she is accepts his proposal. He gives Sunena seven months to accept the proposition, after which the curse will become permanent.

In Yemen, Hatim's marriage is fixed with Jasmin, the princess of Paristan (Fairyland). Hatim and Jasmin meet for the first time and fall in love. Sunena's lover, Prince Vishal of Janakpur, arrives disguised as a beggar. Vishal pleads with Hatim to help him fight Dajjal. The Emperor of Yemen, Hatim, the Emperor of Paristan and Vishal meet. The Emperor of Paristan reveals that when the forces of goodness created Paristan, a prophecy was made that an evil lord would control this world unless the angel of good intervenes. 

Hatim must journey to distant lands and solve seven questions to destroy Dajjal's dark power. The Emperor offers Hatim a magical sword named Jwestrongil. Jasmin lends Hatim her childhood friend and servant, as well as an elf named Hobo, as his bodyguard. As Hatim answers the questions, Dajjal's powers and magical towers are gradually destroyed. However, after Hatim answers the sixth question, there isn't enough time left to solve the seventh question. 

The armies of Yemen, Paristan, Durgapur, and Janakpur descend on Jaffar for the final battle. As they fight against Dajjal's zombie army, Hatim enters the castle and fights Dajjal to death. They both die simultaneously, but Hatim defeats death by obtaining the answer to the seventh question.

Cast
 Rahil Azam as Hatim  ,The Prince of Yemen
 Kiku Sharda as Hobo
 Pooja Ghai Rawal as Jasmine ,The Princess of Paristan
 Nirmal Pandey as Dajjal, King of Jaffar
 Vijay Ganju as Najumi
 Yashwant Mahilwar as Younger Hatim
 Aditi Pratap as Princess Sunayna, Princess of Durgapur
 Romiit Raaj as Prince Vishal, Prince of Janakpur
 Jhanak Shukla as Little Jasmine
 Ravi Khanvilkar as The King of Yemen, Hatim’s father
 Neha Bam as The Queen of Yemen, Hatim's mother
 Reshma as The Queen of Paristan
 Tom Alter as The King of Paristan
 Jaya Bhattacharya as Zalima
 Rushali Arora as Battila
 Usha Bachani as Princess Nadira
 Anisha Hinduja as Red-haired Queen
 Kumar Hegde as Azlaf
 Kishwer Merchant as Rubina
 Manasi Varma as Mallika-e-Hayat
 Tej Sapru as Pasha
 Kavi Kumar Azad as Argois
 Shilpa Shinde as Shakila
 Amrapali Gupta as Chaya, Maya's twin sister
 Shital Thakkar as Maya, Aishwarya's (Mallika-e-Husn) sister
 Ankit Shah as Younger Hobo
 Vinod Kapoor as Anant
 Anwar Fatehan as Hakibo
 Rajeeta Kochhar as Teesta
 Akhil Mishra as Butler
 Devender Chaudhary as Ulta
 Jay Soni as Suarush 
 Ram Awana as Cagaa
 Kamya Punjabi as Jaan-e-Jahan 
 Nimai Bali as Shaitan Keharmaan
 Gireesh Sahdev as King Aashkaan
 Mukul Nag as Bezawal
 Iqbal Azad as Grand Vizier of Akalchand's Kingdom
 Harry Josh as Dracula
 Sunil Chauhan as Qatib-e-Taqdeer
 Pappu Prem

Broadcast
The series has been syndicated to various Indian channels such as Star Plus , Disney Channel India, STAR Utsav and Hungama TV. The series has also been dubbed in Tamil language for STAR Vijay channel titled Maaveeran Hatim.

Awards

In 2004
 The Indian Television Academy Awards|
 Best Costumes - Nikhat Marriam Neerusha
 Best Editing - Papu Trivedi
 Best Make-up - Sagar Entertainment saga
 Best Visual Effects - Jyoti Sagar
 Best Mythological /Historical Serials - Jyoti Sagar Amrit Sagar
 Best Packaging - Amrit Sagar

In 2005
 Best Children Programme Jyoti Sagar Amrit Sagar
 Best Art Direction - Mukesh Kalola
 Best Audiography - Sagar Entertainment
 Best Costumes - Nikhat Mariyam
 Best Make-up - Hari Nawar
 Best Visual Effects - Jyoti Sagar

References

External links

2003 Indian television series debuts
2004 Indian television series endings
StarPlus original programming
Indian children's television series
Works based on One Thousand and One Nights
Indian fantasy television series
Indian epic television series
Genies in television